The Oregon Historical Quarterly is a peer-reviewed public history journal covering topics in the history of the U.S. state of Oregon, for both an academic and a general audience. It has been published continuously on a quarterly schedule by the Oregon Historical Society since 1900. From 1900 to 1925 it was known as The Quarterly of the Oregon Historical Society; its present title was adopted in 1926. Its circulation of about 4,500 makes it one of the largest state historical publications in the United States.

References

External links 

 Searchable transcription of many pre-1964 editions available at wikisource:en:Oregon Historical Quarterly

1900 establishments in Oregon
History journals
Magazines published in Portland, Oregon
Publications established in 1900
Quarterly journals